Siege of Toruń or Siege of Thorn can refer to:
  Siege of Toruń (1658)
 Siege of Toruń (1703)
 Siege of Toruń (1809)